Sir John Sutherland Harmood-Banner, 1st Baronet (8 September 1847 – 24 February 1927) was an English accountant from Liverpool. His interests spread across Lancashire and Cheshire, and extended to the British colonies and South America.

He was also prominent in the civic affairs of Liverpool, where he was a long-serving City Councillor. A Conservative, he was Lord Mayor of Liverpool, and was one of the city's Members of Parliament (MPs) for nearly 20 years.

Early life 
Harmood-Banner was born in Toxteth Park, Liverpool, the second son of accountant Harmood Walter Banner from Bebington in Cheshire. He was educated at Radley College.

Career
He entered the family accountancy firm of Harmood Banner & Son in Liverpool, becoming a partner in 1870. In 1883 he assumed the position of deputy chairman of Pearson and Knowles, a coal and iron conglomerate based in Warrington. For the next 20 years he specialised in accounting work acting as a financial advisor and auditor of a number of major companies.

He was elected MP for Liverpool Everton in a by-election in 1905, sitting until 1924. He was a justice of the peace and deputy lieutenant for Cheshire and was appointed High Sheriff of Cheshire for 1902. He also served as Lord Mayor of the City of Liverpool for 1912, was knighted in July 1913 and created a baronet in 1924.

In later life he served on the boards of a number of companies and on several government committees. He retired in 1925 and died on 24 February 1927 at his home, Ingmire Hall, in Sedbergh, Yorkshire. He was buried in Toxteth Park Cemetery in Liverpool.

Private life
He married twice, firstly Elizabeth, the daughter and coheir of Thomas Knowles, MP of Wigan, with whom he had four sons and two daughters and secondly in 1908 the widow Ella Wilstone, daughter of John Ernest Herbert Linford of Thorpe, Norfolk. He was succeeded by his son Harmood Harmood-Banner.

References 

 "Banner, Sir John Sutherland Harmood-, first baronet (1847–1927)". Oxford Dictionary of National Biography (online ed.). Oxford University Press. doi:10.1093/ref:odnb/47601 . (subscription or UK public library membership required)

External links 
 

1847 births
1927 deaths
People from Toxteth
Businesspeople from Liverpool
English accountants
Mayors of Liverpool
Conservative Party (UK) MPs for English constituencies
UK MPs 1900–1906
UK MPs 1906–1910
UK MPs 1910
UK MPs 1910–1918
UK MPs 1918–1922
UK MPs 1922–1923
UK MPs 1923–1924
Knights Bachelor
Baronets in the Baronetage of the United Kingdom
Politicians from Liverpool
People educated at Radley College
People from Sedbergh
Deputy Lieutenants of Cheshire
High Sheriffs of Cheshire